Tõnu Trubetsky (born 24 April 1963), also known as Tony Blackplait, is an Estonian punk rock/glam punk musician, film and music video director, and individualist anarchist.

Political activity

Trubetsky is a former member of the Estonian Greens. He stood as a candidate in the Estonian parliamentary election in 2007 and the European Parliament election in 2009.  On 5 August 2010, Trubetsky announced he had left the Greens for the Centre Party.

Discography

Vennaskond

Vürst Trubetsky & J. M. K. E. 
Rotipüüdja (2000, MC, CD, Melodija/Kaljukotkas)

The Flowers of Romance 
Sue Catwoman (2004, CDEP, MFM Records)
Sue Catwoman (2004, CD, The Flowers of Romance)
Paris (2006, CD, Līgo)

Compilation including The Flowers of Romance 

Punk Occupation 12 (2006, CD, Feńka R'n'R/Crazy Rat) - Girl in Black

 Filmography 
 As director Millennium (1998, VHS, 90 min., Faama Film/Trubetsky Pictures)Ma armastan Ameerikat (2001, VHS, 140 min., DayDream Productions/Trubetsky Pictures)Sügis Ida-Euroopas (2004, 2DVD, 185 min., DayDream/Trubetsky Pictures)New York (2006, DVD, 140 min., Trubetsky Pictures)Pirates of Destiny (2007, DVD, 150 min., Trubetsky Pictures)

 As actor Serenade (dir. Rao Heidmets, 1987)The Sweet Planet (dir. Aarne Ahi, 1987)War (dir. Hardi Volmer & Riho Unt, 1987)Hysteria (dir. Pekka Karjalainen, 1992)Moguchi (music by Vennaskond, dir. Toomas Griin & Jaak Eelmets, 2004)Punklaulupidu (dir. Erle Veber, 2008)

 Bibliography Pogo (poetry; 1989) Inglid ja kangelased (Angels And Heroes; novel; with Anti Pathique; 1992)Anarhia (Anarchy; poetry; 1994) Daam sinises (Lady In Blue; punk novel; with Anti Pathique; 1994)Mina ja George (Me And George; novel; 1996)Trubetsky (poetry; 2000) Inglid ja kangelased (Angels And Heroes; novel; with Anti Pathique and Juhan Habicht; 2002) Anarhistid. Anarhia agendid. Maailmarevolutsiooni prelüüd. Anarhistliku liikumise ajalugu (The Anarchists: Agents of Anarchy. Prelude of World Revolution: A History of Anarchist Movement; 2003) Susi jutud (The Tales of Susi; novel; with Anti Pathique; 2007) Eesti punk 1976–1990. Anarhia ENSV-s (Estonian punk 1976–1990. Anarchy in The ESSR; with Cat Bloomfield; 2009)Eesti punk 1972–1990. Haaknõela külm helk (Tõnu Trubetsky & Kalev Lehola, 2012, Kunst,  {trükis},  {epub}) «Hukkunud Alpinisti» hotelli müsteerium'' (Tõnu Trubetsky, Tõnu Trubetsky, Tom Claude Trubetsky, sarjas "Mirabilia", 2013, Līgo)

References

External links 

1963 births
Living people
Anarcho-punk musicians
Estonian male film actors
Estonian anarchists
Estonian film directors
Estonian journalists
21st-century Estonian male singers
20th-century Estonian poets
21st-century Estonian poets
Estonian male poets
Estonian rock singers
Individualist anarchists
Musicians from Tallinn
Politicians from Tallinn
Writers from Tallinn
Punk rock musicians
Tonu
Estonian Centre Party politicians
Estonian people of Polish descent
20th-century Estonian male singers